Listing's law, named after German mathematician Johann Benedict Listing (1808–1882), describes the three-dimensional orientation of the eye and its axes of rotation. Listing's law has been shown to hold when the head is stationary and upright and gaze is directed toward far targets, i.e., when the eyes are either fixating, making saccades, or pursuing moving visual targets.

Listing's law (often abbreviated L1) has been generalized to yield the binocular extension of Listing's law (often abbreviated L2) which also covers vergence.

Definition 
Listing's law states that the eye does not achieve all possible 3D orientations and that, instead, all achieved eye orientations can be reached by starting from one specific "primary" reference orientation and then rotating about an axis that lies within the plane orthogonal to the primary orientation's gaze direction (line of sight / visual axis). This plane is called Listing's plane.

It can be shown that Listing's law implies that, if we start from any chosen eye orientation, all achieved eye orientations can be reached by starting from this orientation and then rotating about an axis that lies within a specific plane that is associated with this chosen orientation. (Only for the primary reference orientation is the gaze direction orthogonal to its associated plane.)

Listing's law can be deduced without starting with the orthogonality assumption. If one assumes that all achieved eye orientations can be reached from some chosen eye orientation and then rotating about an axis that lies within some specific plane, then the existence of a unique primary orientation with an orthogonal Listing's plane is assured.

The expression of Listing's law can be simplified by creating a coordinate system where the origin is primary position, the vertical and horizontal axes of rotation are aligned in Listing's plane, and the third (torsional) axis is orthogonal to Listing's plane. In this coordinate system, Listing's law simply states that the torsional component of eye orientation is held at zero. (Note that this is not the same description of ocular torsion as rotation around the line of sight: whereas movements that start or end at the primary position can indeed be performed without any rotation about the line of sight, this is not the case for arbitrary movements.) Listing's law can also be formulated in a coordinate-free form using geometric algebra.

Listing's law is the specific realization of the more general 'Donders' law', which states that for any one gaze direction the eye's 3D spatial orientation is unique and independent of how the eye reached that gaze direction (previous gaze directions / eye orientations / temporal movements).

Purpose 
There has been considerable debate for over a century whether the purpose of Listing's law is primarily motor or perceptual. Some modern neuroscientists -who have tended to emphasize optimization of multiple variables- consider Listing's law to be the best compromise between motor factors (e.g., taking the shortest possible rotation path) and visual factors (see below for details).

Common misconceptions 
 It is often assumed the primary position is at the mechanical center of the eye's range of movement. Primary position can only be determined by measuring Listing's plane. Direct measurements show that the location of primary position (and thus the orientation of Listing's plane) varies between subjects. Primary position is generally close to center, but it may be rotated slightly up or down, left or right.
 It is often misunderstood that Listing's law says that the eye only rotates about axes in Listing's plane. This is incorrect. Listing's plane only provides the orientations of the eye relative to primary position, expressed as an angle of rotation about some axis in Listing's plane (normally using the right-hand rule, where one curls the fingers of the right hand in the direction of rotation and the thumb then points in the direction of the rotation vector). This is not the same as the axes that the eye actually rotates about; in fact, Listing's law requires that the rotation axis of most saccades lies outside of Listing's plane, more specifically, the rotation axis lies in Listing's plane only if the movement starts or ends at the primary position or if it is a prolongation of such a movement.

The axes of rotation associated with Listing's law are only in Listing's plane for movements that head toward or away from primary position. For all other eye movements towards or away from some non-primary position, the eye must rotate about an axis of rotation that tilts out of Listing's plane. Such axes lie in a specific plane associated with this non-primary position. This plane's normal lies halfway between the primary gaze direction and the gaze direction of this non-primary position. This is called 'the half angle rule'. (This complication is one of the most difficult aspects of Listing's law to understand, but it follows directly from the non-commutative laws of physical rotation, which specify that one rotation followed by a second rotation does not yield the same result as these same rotations performed in the inverse order.)

Modifications and violations 
Listing's law is not obeyed when the eyes counter-rotate during head rotation to maintain gaze stability, either due to the Vestibulo-ocular reflex (VOR) or the optokinetic reflex. Here the eye simply rotates about approximately the same axis as the head (which could even be a pure torsional rotation). This generally results in slow movements that drive the eye torsionally out of Listing's plane. However, when the head translates without rotating, gaze direction remains stable but Listing's law is still maintained.

Listing's law persists but takes on a torsional bias when the head is held at a tilted posture and the eyes counter-roll, and when the head is held steady upward or downward Listing's plane tilts slightly in the opposite direction.

When larger 'gaze saccades' are accompanied by a head movement, Listing's law cannot be maintained constantly because VOR movements occur during or toward the end of the movement sequence. In this case, saccades take on torsional components equal and opposite to the oncoming torsional movements such that Listing's law is transiently violated, but the eye ends up at zero torsion in the end.

Listing's law does not hold during sleep.

Listing's law holds during fixation, saccades, and smooth pursuit. Furthermore, Listing's law has been generalized to the binocular extension of Listing's law which holds also during vergence.

Binocular extension 
While Listing's law holds only for eyes that fixate a distant point (at optical infinity), it has been extended to include also vergence. From this binocular extension of Listing's law, it follows that vergence can lead to a change of cyclotorsion. The Listing's planes of the two eyes tilt outward, opposite to the eyes, when they converge on a near target. During convergence, there is a relative excyclotorsion on upgaze and a relative incyclotorsion on downgaze.

Shape and thickness 
Certain slight physiological deviations from Listing's rule are commonly described in terms of the "shape" and "thickness" of Listing's plane:
the "shape" specifies in how far it is indeed a (flat) plane or more generally a somewhat curved surface, and 
the "thickness" specifies in how far eye movements indeed lie precisely within the plane (or surface) or may lie just slightly next to it.

Visual consequences 
Since Listing's law and its variants determine the orientation of the eye(s) for any particular gaze direction, it therefore determines the spatial pattern of visual stimulation on the retina(s). For example, since Listing's law defines torsion as zero about a head-fixed axis, this results in 'false torsional' tilts about the line of sight when the eye is at tertiary (oblique) positions, which the brain must compensate for when interpreting the visual image. Torsion is not good for binocular vision because it complicates the already difficult problem of matching images from the two eyes for stereopsis (depth vision). The binocular version of Listing's law is thought to be a best compromise to simplify this problem, although it does not completely rid the visual system of the need to know current eye orientation.

Physiology 
In the 1990s there was considerable debate about whether Listing's law is a neural or mechanical phenomenon. However, the accumulated evidence suggests that both factors play a role in the implementation of different aspects of Listing's law.

The horizontal recti muscles of the eyes only contribute to horizontal eye rotation and position, but the vertical recti and oblique muscles each have approximately equal vertical and torsional actions (in Listing's plane coordinates). Thus, to hold eye position in Listing's plane there needs to be a balance of activation between these muscles so that torsion cancels to zero.

The eye muscles may also contribute to Listing's law by having position-dependent pulling directions during motion, i.e., this might be the mechanism that implements the 'half angle' rule described above.

Higher gaze control centers in the frontal cortex and superior colliculus are only concerned with pointing gaze in the right direction and do not appear to be involved in 3-D eye control or the implementation of Listing's law. However the brainstem reticular formation centers that control vertical eye position (the interstitial nucleus of Cajal; INC) and saccade velocity (the rostral interstitial nucleus of the medial longitudinal fasciculus; riMLF) are equally involved in torsional control, each being divided into populations of neurons that control directions similar to those of the vertical and torsional pulling eye muscles. However, these neural coordinate systems appear to align with Listing's plane in a way that probably simplifies Listing's law: positive and negative torsional control is balanced across the midline of the brainstem so that equal activation produces positions and movements in Listing's plane. Thus torsional control is only needed for movements toward or away from Listing's plane. However, it remains unclear how 2-D activity in the higher gaze centres results in the right pattern of 3-D activity in the brainstem. The brainstem premotor centers (INC, riMLF, etc.) project to the motoneurons for eye muscles, which encode positions and displacements of the eyes while leaving the 'half angle rule' to the mechanics of the eyes itself (see above). The cerebellum also plays a role in correcting deviations from Listing's plane.

Pathology 
Damage to any of the physiology described above can disrupt Listing's law, and thus have negative impacts for vision. Disorders of the eye muscles (such as strabismus) often cause torsional offsets in eye position that are particularly troublesome when they differ between the two eyes, as the resulting cyclodisparity may lead to cyclodisplopia (double vision due to relative torsion) and may prevent binocular fusion. Damage to the vestibular system and brainstem reticular formation centres for 3-D eye control can cause torsional offsets and/or torsional drifting motion of the eyes that severely disrupts vision. Degeneration of the Cerebellum causes torsional control to become 'sloppy'. Similar effects occur during alcohol consumption.

The influence of strabismus surgery on the Listing's planes of the two eyes is not fully understood. In one study, patients' eyes showed greater adherence to Listing's rule after the operation, however the relative orientation of the Listing's planes of the two eyes had changed.

Measurement 
The orientation of Listing's plane (equivalently, the location of the primary position) of an individual can be measured using scleral coils. It can also be measured using a synoptometer.

Alternatively, it can be measured using eye tracking (see also Eye tracking on the ISS for an example).

Discovery and history 
Listing's law was named after German mathematician Johann Benedict Listing (1808–1882). (It is not clear how Listing derived this idea.) Listing's law was first confirmed experimentally by the 19th century polymath Hermann von Helmholtz, who compared visual afterimages at various eye positions to predictions derived from Listing's law and found that they matched. Listing's law was first measured directly, with the use of 3-D eye coils in the 1980s by Ferman, Collewijn and colleagues. In the late 1980s Tweed and Vilis were the first to directly measure and visualize Listing's plane, and also contributed to the understanding of the laws of rotational kinematics that underlie Listing's law. Since then many investigators have used similar technology to test various aspects of Listing's law. Demer and Miller have championed the role of eye muscles, whereas Crawford and colleagues worked out several of the neural mechanisms described above over the past two decades.

References

Further reading 
 Agnes M.F. Wong: A Clinician-Friendly Approach to Understanding Listing’s Law (PDF; 754 KB)

External links 
 What is Listing's law?, Schor Lab, University of California at Berkeley (with a graphical illustration of Listing's law)

Ophthalmology